Mongkol Aimmanolrom (born 1934) is a Thai basketball player. He competed in the men's tournament at the 1956 Summer Olympics.

References

External links

1934 births
Living people
Mongkol Aimmanolrom
Mongkol Aimmanolrom
Basketball players at the 1956 Summer Olympics
Place of birth missing (living people)